This list of Nobel laureates affiliated with Washington University in St. Louis as alumni or faculty comprehensively shows alumni (graduates and attendees) or faculty members (professors of various ranks, researchers, and visiting lecturers or professors) affiliated with Washington University in St. Louis who were awarded the Nobel Prize or the Nobel Memorial Prize in Economic Sciences. People who have given public lectures, talks or non-curricular seminars; studied as non-degree students; received honorary degrees; or served as administrative staff at the university are excluded from the list. Summer school attendees and visitors are generally excluded from the list, since summer terms are not part of formal academic years; the same rule applies to the extension school.

The Nobel Prizes are awarded annually by the Royal Swedish Academy of Sciences, the Karolinska Institute, and the Norwegian Nobel Committee to individuals who make outstanding contributions in the fields of chemistry, physics, literature, peace, and physiology or medicine. They were established by the 1895 will of Alfred Nobel, which dictates that the awards should be administered by the Nobel Foundation. Another prize, the Nobel Memorial Prize in Economic Sciences, was established in 1968 by the Sveriges Riksbank, the central bank of Sweden, for contributors to the field of economics. Each prize is awarded by a separate committee; the Royal Swedish Academy of Sciences awards the Prizes in Physics, Chemistry, and Economics, the Karolinska Institute awards the Prize in Physiology or Medicine, and the Norwegian Nobel Committee awards the Prize in Peace. Each recipient receives a medal, a diploma and a cash prize that has varied throughout the years. In 1901, the winners of the first Nobel Prizes were given 150,782 SEK, which is equal to 7,731,004 SEK in December 2007. In 2008, the winners were awarded a prize amount of 10,000,000 SEK. The awards are presented in Stockholm in an annual ceremony on December 10, the anniversary of Nobel's death.

As of 2022, there have been 26 laureates affiliated with Washington University in St. Louis. Washington University considers laureates who attended the university as undergraduate students, graduate students or were members of the faculty as affiliated laureates. Arthur Compton, the chancellor of the university from 1945 to 1953, was the first laureate affiliated with the university, winning the Nobel Prize in Physics in 1927. Four Nobel Prizes were shared by Washington University laureates; Joseph Erlanger and Herbert Spencer Gasser won the 1944 Nobel Prize in Physiology or Medicine, Carl Ferdinand Cori and wife Gerty Cori won the 1947 Nobel Prize in Physiology or Medicine, Arthur Kornberg and Severo Ochoa won the 1959 Nobel Prize in Physiology or Medicine, and Daniel Nathans and George Davis Snell won the 1980 Nobel Prize in Physiology or Medicine. Seventeen Washington University laureates have won the Nobel Prize in Physiology or Medicine, more than any other category. With the exception of Daniel Nathans, who received his M.D. from Washington University and William E. Moerner who received his undergraduate degrees from the university, all Washington University laureates have been members of the university faculty. Also of note, co-discoverer of the neutrino Clyde Cowan, received master's and doctoral degrees from the university but died before the Nobel Prize was awarded for that work in 1995.

Laureates

References
General

Specific

External links
Official website of Washington University in St. Louis
Official website of the Royal Swedish Academy of Sciences
Official website of the Nobel Foundation

Nobel laureates
Washington University in St. Louis
Washington University Nobel laureates